The Military Order of the Purple Heart Bridge, named after the Military Order of the Purple Heart, carries U.S. Route 40 and US 250 over the Ohio River back channel between Wheeling Island, West Virginia and Bridgeport, Ohio.  Construction began in 1995 and finished in 1998.

The bridge was built to replace the adjacent Bridgeport Bridge which had fallen into disrepair.

See also
List of crossings of the Ohio River

Further reading
Bridgeport Bridge at Bridges & Tunnels

References

Road bridges in West Virginia
Bridges completed in 1998
Bridges over the Ohio River
Buildings and structures in Wheeling, West Virginia
Transportation in Ohio County, West Virginia
Bridges in Belmont County, Ohio
Road bridges in Ohio
U.S. Route 40
U.S. Route 250
Bridges of the United States Numbered Highway System
Girder bridges in the United States
1998 establishments in Ohio
1998 establishments in West Virginia